Medicine is the modern field of medical practice and health care.

Medicine may also refer to:

Medical treatments
 Internal medicine, medical specialty concerned with the diagnosis, management and nonsurgical treatment of unusual or serious diseases
 Other systems of medicine including:
 Acupuncture
 Anthroposophic medicine
 Ayurveda
 Chiropractic
 Herbalism
 Homeopathy
 Native American ethnobotany - herbal medicine
 Native American medicine - spiritual and ceremonial healing
 Naturopathy
 Osteopathy
 Shamanism
 Traditional medicine
 Traditional Chinese Medicine (TCM)
 Traditional Tibetan medicine
 Medication, licensed pharmaceutical drugs
Pharmacology
Herbal medicine

Books and periodicals
  Medicine (Elsevier journal), a review journal for physicians founded in 1972 and now published by Elsevier
 Medicine (Lippincott Williams & Wilkins journal), an academic journal founded in 1922 and published by Lippincott Williams & Wilkins
 Medicine: Prep Manual for Undergraduates
 Medicine Magazine, a British consumer health magazine

Arts and entertainment

Music

Albums
 Medicine (Drew Holcomb and the Neighbors album), 2015
 Medicine (Pop Levi album), 2012
 The Medicine (John Mark McMillan album), 2010
 The Medicine (Planet Asia album), 2006

Songs
 "Medicine" (Bring Me the Horizon song), 2019
 "Medicine" (Grace Potter and the Nocturnals song), 2010
 "Medicine" (Harry Styles song), 2018
 "Medicine" (James Arthur song), 2021
 "Medicine" (Jennifer Lopez song), 2019
 "Medicine" (Plies song), 2009
 "Medicine" (Shakira song), 2014
 "Medicine" (The 1975 song), 2014
 "Meditjin", a song by Baker Boy
 "Medicine", a song by Daughter from The Wild Youth
 "Medicine", a song by Gloria Estefan  from Miss Little Havana
 "Medicine", an unreleased song by Harry Styles
 "Medicine", a song by Hollywood Undead from Notes from the Underground
 "Medicine", a song by Jesu from Conqueror
 "Medicine", a song by Kelly Clarkson from the album Meaning of Life
 "Medicine", a song by MF Grimm from the album You Only Live Twice: The Audio Graphic Novel
 "Medicine", a song by Simon Townshend from the album Among Us
 "Medicine", a song by Starfucker from the album Jupiter
 "Medicine", a song by Tindersticks from the album The Something Rain
 "The Medicine Song", a 1984 song by Stephanie Mills
 "Wedicine" (pronounced as "Medicine"), a song by D'espairsRay from the single "Love Is Dead"

Other uses in arts and entertainment
 Medicine (band), alternative noise-pop/rock band
 Medicine (Klimt Painting), a painting by Gustav Klimt
 Medicine (short story), a 1919 short story by Lu Xun

See also
 
 
 Medic (disambiguation)